Lillehammer Ishockeyklubb is an ice hockey club based in Nestan, Norway and playing in the GET-ligaen.  Home games are played in Eidsiva Arena (Kristins Hall), and occasionally in Håkons Hall.

History
Founded on 2 November 1957, Lillehammer IK was a pioneer of ice hockey in the northern areas of eastern Norway.  Playing under difficult conditions on natural ice for the first thirty years, success was limited to the odd foray into the second tier of the hockey league.  However, they produced some fine talents, two of them brothers Arne and Lars Bergseng, who went on to become two of the best players in the first division during the 1980s.

The big break for the hockey club was Lillehammer's candidacy for the 1994 Winter Olympics.  In this process the Kristins Hall hockey arena was built and opened in 1988.  The city got its Olympics, and the hockey club their boost.  Backed by enormous local interest they surged from the third division to the Eliteserien in only three years, but the success would not stop there.  In the spring of 1994, after the Olympics was over, Lillehammer beat local rivals Storhamar Ishockey in the playoff finals to claim their first, and to date only Norwegian Championship.

Since the heady Olympic days of the early 1990s, Lillehammer IK have struggled keep up the high level people started to expect.  Economic problems have on several occasions threatened the club's existence.  Today the club is known for a good youth department, helped on by the hockey college NTG, producing players such as current Chicago Blackhawks player Andreas Martinsen, former Columbus Blue Jackets and Philadelphia Flyers forward Ole Kristian Tollefsen, and Per Åge Skrøder, formerly with MODO Hockey of the Swedish Elite League.

After the struggles of the late 1990s and 2000s, Lillehammer IK rose to become one of the better clubs in Norway through their stellar player development during the early 2010s. However after being one game away from the finals in 2014 but then eventually losing in seven games to the eventual champion Stavanger Oilers, the club hit two rough seasons, the latter 2015-16 season ending in relegation play. But in only two seasons the team was able to elevate to their second best season ever during the 2017-18 season, ending up with a bronze medal in the series and their first finals appearance in 24 years in the playoffs.

On the 18 November 2017, the club hosted an event called Hockey Classic, a game between Lillehammer IK and their rival Storhamar in Håkons Hall. This was the first time since 1995 they had played against each other in Håkons Hall, and the game was a success financially and socially, with the attendance setting a new indoor Norwegian hockey record with 10,031 in attendance. On 17 November 2018, a new Hockey Classic took place, with over 9000 spectators experiencing Lillehammer beating Storhamar 3-2 after an impressive homecoming from Alexander Reichenberg.

Season-by-season results
This is a partial list of the last five seasons completed by Lillehammer. For the full season-by-season history, see List of Lillehammer IK seasons.

Players

Current roster
Current roster (as of October 12, 2018):

Retired numbers

Records and statistics
  – current active player

Most matches
Includes regular season and playoffs.

Last updated: 30 May 2018

Former notable players
 Åge Ellingsen
 Ole Kristian Tollefsen
 Per Åge Skrøder
 Andreas Martinsen
 Tomáš Sršeň
 Martin Špaňhel
 R.J. Anderson
 Gino Guyer
 Brett Cameron
 Lars Erik Spets
 Troy Rutkowski

References

External links
  

 
Ice hockey clubs established in 1957
Ice hockey teams in Norway
GET-ligaen teams
Sport in Lillehammer
1957 establishments in Norway